Ogbah may be,

Ogbah people
Ogbah language
Emmanuel Ogbah